Hardin County Airport  is a public airport located three miles southwest of Kenton, Ohio, United States. It is owned and operated by the Hardin County Airport Authority.

Facilities and aircraft 
For the 12-month period ending September 27, 2013, the airport had 6,562 aircraft operations: 90.4% general aviation and 9.6% air taxi.

References

External links 

County airports in Ohio